Jill Whelan (born September 29, 1966)  is an American actress. She played Vicki Stubing, the daughter of Captain Stubing, in all nine seasons of the American television series The Love Boat (1977-1986). She later guest starred on the revival Love Boat: The Next Wave.

Early life 
Jill Whelan was born in Oakland, California. After auditioning and appearing in a local production of The King and I at the age of 8, she sent her school picture to a San Francisco Talent Agency and landed a series of TV commercials.

An M&M commercial got her noticed by producers, and she was cast in Friends (1979), which was quickly cancelled. Concurrently, at the age of 11, she was cast as Vicki, Captain Stubing's daughter, initially as a guest star but later making regular appearances.

In 1984, Whelan graduated from the Buckley School in Sherman Oaks, California (a close friend of classmate Laura Dern) with a stint at Guildford College in Surrey, England where she studied English Literature before coming back to Los Angeles.

Career 
As well as starring in The Love Boat, Whelan made numerous guest appearances in TV shows including Fantasy Island (twice), Vegas, Trapper John, M.D., Matt Houston and Battle of the Network Stars. In late 1979, she played the role of Lisa Davis, a heart patient, in Airplane!

In the mid-1980s, in Los Angeles, having returned from England and with The Love Boat coming to an end, Whelan moved to New York City and worked as an event producer at Madison Square Garden, where she helped set up acts.

In 1999, Whelan left acting, started working as an investigative producer at the Los Angeles television station KCOP, and continued as a radio show host for 1210 WPHT radio.

On November 25, 2001, Whelan appeared on an episode of The Weakest Link, a trivia game show hosted by Anne Robinson. Whelan competed against other celebrity 1970s TV stars, including Mackenzie Phillips, Nell Carter, Cindy Williams, Joan Van Ark, Erin Moran, Erik Estrada, and Fred "Re-run" Berry. She outlasted the others, winning $57,000 for her charity.

On September 10, 2008, Whelan appeared with several other cast members from the movie Airplane! in a reunion segment on NBC's Today Show. In October 2008, she made her New York City cabaret debut with her one-woman show Jill Whelan: An Evening in Dry Dock at the Metropolitan Room. From September to November 2011, Whelan appeared in the British farce Move Over Mrs. Markham at Stage West Theatre Restaurant in the Toronto, Ontario area.

Whelan was set to replace Mark Thompson, who retired on August 17, 2012, after 25 years co-hosting The Mark & Brian Show on KLOS in Los Angeles, but during Thompson's final broadcast, co-host Brian Phelps announced that he, too, was quitting KLOS.

In 2013, Whelan became co-host with Brian Phelps of The Brian and Jill Show. The two share a love for improvisational comedy, and have created hundreds of characters together that they have performed on stage during improvisation shows and in sketches on their podcast.

Whelan is mentioned in "Dead Man Sliding", the tenth episode of the third season of Sliders, as an actress who never had relevance in the dimension of the protagonists.

Campaigning 
During the early 1980s, Whelan served as a national spokeswoman for First Lady Nancy Reagan's "Just Say No" anti-drug campaign.

Personal life 

Whelan met her first husband, Brad St. John, as an associate producer for UPN News in Los Angeles, shortly after leaving Madison Square Garden. They married in December 1993. Soon after their wedding, she became pregnant with their first son, Harrison. Whelan divorced St. John in 2001.

Returning to the East Coast, she married her second husband, Michael Chaykowsky, in April 2004. Her second son, Grant, was born in 2006.  In 2014, Whelan filed for divorce from Chaykowsky.

In 2015, Whelan was hired by Princess Cruises as  a celebrations ambassador.

Whelan married former Denver Broncos quarterback Jeff Knapple in 2017.

References

External links 
 

Living people
Actresses from Oakland, California
American child actresses
American women singers
American film actresses
American television actresses
Musicians from Oakland, California
Singers from California
21st-century American women
1966 births